The Gypsy Trail is a 1918 American silent comedy film directed by Walter Edwards and written by Robert Housum and Julia Crawford Ivers. The film stars Bryant Washburn, Wanda Hawley, Casson Ferguson, Clarence Geldart, Georgie Stone, and Edythe Chapman. The film was released on November 17, 1918, by Paramount Pictures.

Plot
As described in a film magazine, Edward Andrews (Washburn) worships the romance-loving Frances Raymond (Hawley), the daughter of wealthy parents, but she always turns down his proposals. Finally, she hints that she may be won over using caveman tactics. Edward hires a reporter, Michael Rudder (Ferguson), to kidnap Frances and take her to his country home, where he has installed his grandmother (Chapman) to act as a chaperon. Frances is won over by the ardent lovemaking of the reporter and when she suggests that they get married at once, the poor reporter runs away. Frances is now inconsolable, and Edward very obligingly goes in search of the wooer. When they return, the reporter reveals that he is wealthy and has a title and estate in England, but Frances decides in favor of the conventional Edward.

Cast
Bryant Washburn as Edward Andrews
Wanda Hawley as Frances Raymond
Casson Ferguson as Michael Rudder
Clarence Geldart as Frank Raymond
Georgie Stone as John Raymond
Edythe Chapman as Grandma

Preservation
With no copies of The Gypsy Trail located in any film archives, it is a lost film.

References

External links

Lantern slide

1918 films
1910s English-language films
Silent American comedy films
1918 comedy films
Paramount Pictures films
Films directed by Walter Edwards
American black-and-white films
American silent feature films
Lost American films
1918 lost films
Lost comedy films
1910s American films